Back to the Wall is a recording by American folk and blues guitarist Peter Lang, released in 1978. It is out of print.

Track listing

Side one
 "Going Down the China Road" (Peter Lang, Public Domain) – 3:28
 "Back to the Wall" (Lang) – 2:10
 "Guitar Rag	" (Sylvester Weaver, Traditional) – 1:52
 "Country Blues Medley" (Traditional) – 2:00
 "Jimmy Bell" (Cat Iron, Lang) – 2:45
 "Colored Aristocracy" (Traditional) – 1:45

Side two
 "My Dear Mary Anne" (Lang) – 3:10
 "Halloween Blues"  (Lang) – 3:45
 "Living in the Weeds" (Lang) – 2:00
 "Windy and Warm" (John D. Loudermilk) – 1:40
 "This World Is Not My Home" (Traditional) – 2:12
 "Farewell Maximillian" (Lang) – 2:45

Personnel
Peter Lang – vocals, guitar
Jeff Dayton – pedal steel guitar
Brad Grapp – drums
James Hauck – marimba
Prudence Johnson – vocals
Tom Lieberman – vocals
Tim Sparks – vocals
Gary Lopac – bass
Jim Price – violin
Ted Unseth – saxophone
John Bennett – trombone
Mark Brunner – trumpet

Production
Produced by James Hauck
Engineered by Michael McKern

References 

1978 albums
Peter Lang (guitarist) albums